Wayne Henderson may refer to:

 Wayne Henderson (footballer) (born 1983), Irish goalkeeper
 Wayne Henderson (luthier), American luthier specializing in handmade, custom acoustic guitars
 Wayne Henderson (musician) (1939–2014), American soul-jazz and hard bop trombonist and record producer
 Wayne Henderson (alpine skier), Canadian former alpine skier